Gatekeepers (小兵迎大将) is a Singaporean Chinese language game show which aired in 2010 on MediaCorp Channel 8. The series premiered on 31 August 2010 and ended on 23 November, airing on 13 Tuesday nights at 8:00pm.  Hosted by Guo Liang along with Dennis Chew (as "Aunty Lucy"), each episode features 36 Primary 5 and 6 students from a primary school who are challenged with the task of "defending" a cash prize of S$18,000 for their school.

The show was nominated for the Best Variety Show award for the Star Awards 2011.

Rules
The rules of Gatekeepers is basically similar to 1 vs. 100 but also crosses with Are You Smarter than a 5th Grader?; a team of three celebrities (or contestants) faced off against 36 different Primary 5 and 6 Students from a school, each seated in a cubicle. A contestant choose from one of the eight possible subjects, and a multiple-choice question with four options is revealed. As like 1 vs. 100, the students are given a short amount of time to lock in their answer before the contestant is given the opportunity to answer the question. If the contestant answers correctly, all the students that answered the question incorrectly are eliminated from further play, bringing the team closer to winning the game. The amount of money in the team's bank also increases by a fixed rate of S$500, which is dependent on the number of students eliminated in that question. However, if the contestant is incorrect, their turn ends and no money will be banked for the team. The contestant's turn ends automatically after answering his or her eighth question, after which the contestant has to step down for the remainder of the game. Unlike 1 vs. 100, contestants or teams may not walk away at any point during the game, and all three contestants were required to participate.

The game ends when all members of either side have been eliminated. If the team successfully eliminated every one of 36 students per every correct answer, the team will win whatever they've banked at the end of the game, which would go to a charity of their choice. If all the members were eliminated and at least one student survives at the end of the game, the team loses while the school wins any money they have left at the end. Up to S$18,000 can be won from one team at the end of the game, whichever if all 36 students have either survived or eliminated by the team at the end of the game.

Helps
The celebrities receives opportunities to receive assistance from the students, known as "helps". Five helps are offered, which could only be used once throughout the entire game. Only one help can be used per question.
同舟共济: The celebrity discusses the question from the other team members.
军师出马: The celebrity phones a friend to assist with the question.
刺探军情: One student was randomly selected by the celebrity, allowing the celebrity to use their answer as reference before they give their own.
一箭双雕: Two random incorrect answers were eliminated from the current question, leaving behind the correct answer and one incorrect answer.
 寡不敌众: The celebrity is forced to go with the answer selected by the majority of the students (i.e. the answer which most of the students chose). If there is a tie between 2 or more answers as the majority, the celebrity can choose between those answers.

Question topics
All questions asked in the show are based on the national curriculum taught in Singaporean schools.

Primary 3 or 4 Science
Primary 3 Maths
Primary 4 Maths
Primary 5 Chinese
Primary 5 Social Studies
Primary 5 or 6 Science
Primary 6 Chinese
Home Economics/Life Skills

Episodes
 Indicates the school team had at least one member remaining and the celebrity teams loses, with the students winning the remaining prize money.
 Indicates all 36 members from the school team were eliminated and the celebrity team wins the money for charity.

Controversy
Prior to the broadcast of the third episode, an ongoing online feud between host Guo Liang and Elvin Ng (one of the contestants on that episode) caused over comments exchanged in the dressing room during filming of the series Breakout (in which both Guo and Ng were actors). The trailer also aired the feud, causing the viewership ratings to drop, and become the only episode to be given a Parental Guidance (PG) rating.

External links
Official Website
Gatekeepers  on Mediacorp website

Singaporean game shows